Theodosius (secular name Igor Ivanovich Protsyuk, ; 7 January 1927 – 28 May 2016) was the Metropolitan of Omsk and Tara.

Notes

1927 births
2016 deaths
Eastern Orthodox metropolitans
Bishops of Chernihiv